Dead Dozen is a first-person shooter with survival horror elements. The game was announced on November 8, 2017 and released on Steam on March 7, 2018.

Gameplay
The game takes place in 1993 on an abandoned Soviet research base in Siberia, where 12 people (Survivors) were isolated from the rest of the world. Each round, one of them randomly becomes the leader of the ghouls. All whom he killed or infected, reborn in his team after their death.
Each of the two teams - Survivors and Ghouls - is different in gameplay, abilities, tactical capabilities, game goals and visual accompaniment.
Survivors can collect weapons, useful items, various gadgets, and barricade with special barricade sets.
Ghouls can infect humans, break down walls and use their special abilities to surpass humans in battle.

References

Indie video games
Windows games
Windows-only games
Video games with Steam Workshop support
2018 video games
Video games developed in Russia
Video games set in Russia
First-person shooters
Multiplayer video games